Financial Management Reform Programme is a  Programme under the Finance Division of Ministry of Finance of Government of Bangladesh.

History
Financial Management Reform Programme was established by the Government of Bangladesh with the support of Department for International Development. It started function from 1 March 2003.

References

Ministry of Finance (Bangladesh)
2003 establishments in Bangladesh
Organisations based in Dhaka
Government agencies of Bangladesh
Government agencies established in 2003